Shadow over the Islands is an East German black-and-white film, directed by Otto Meyer. It was released in 1952.

Plot
In a small village on the Faroe Islands, the people's only source of income is trapping a local breed of wild birds. The corrupt capitalist Mr. Brause exploits the locals, forcing them to work for a low wage while selling the birds with a high profit. A disease strikes the village, and many inhabitants become ill. A local physician, Dr. Stefan Horn, discovers that the source of the sickness is the birds. He sends a telegram to a medical research institute in Copenhagen. The scientists in the capital corroborate his suspicions. Brause destroys their letter and tells the villagers that they can continue with their trade. Eventually, Stefan and his cousin, Arne, manage to expose the truth before the people. Brause flees the islands.

Cast
 Erwin Geschonneck as Dr. Sten Horn
 Fritz Diez as Arne Horn
 Willy A. Kleinau as Bassen Brause
 Kriemhild Falke as Mette Horn
 Siegfried Weber as Thorsten Horn
 Lutz Götz as Dr. Jakobson
 Georg Kröning as Dr. Mattisson
 Hans Jungbauer as Mikkelson
 Ernst Kahler as Kanvala
 Walter B. Schulz  as secretary Falberg
 Rudolf Wessely as secretary Palle
 Kurt Mühlhardt as police chief Almquist
 Herbert Richter as Magnus
 Gert  Schäfer, as Per
 Hans Wehrl as Mac Tunck

Production
At 1952, the East German film industry sank to the lowest point in its history. Due to increasing supervision by the Socialist Unity Party, manifested in the new DEFA Commission of the SED's Politburo that oversaw the eponymous film studio, many productions were canceled or thoroughly censured to insure compliance with the state's ideological line. DEFA produced only six films during 1952. Under the influence of the nascent Cold War, five of them contrasted the life in the Socialist Eastern Bloc with those in the West. Among those, four dealt with the subject directly, while Shadow over the Islands was an allegory, using the setting of a Faroese village for presenting the same theme.

Reception
Miera and Antonin Liehm cited Shadow over the Islands as an example to the East German films in which a positive hero - always with working-class background - was confronted by a negative one, which was mostly a former Nazi or a representative of the West, and often both. They concluded that at the time, "directors did not even try for anything than the simplest stories, filmed in the most straightforward ways. For instance... Shadow over the Islands... Shows how capitalist merchants threaten the health of the people." Sylvia Klötzer shared this view, writing that the film was a typical example of the DEFA pictures produced during the early 1950s, with a schematic plot centered on an archetypical character with little depth. Author Udo Benzenhöfer, on the contrary, commented that the picture was a "realistic one, with many references to the broader issues of society."

References

External links
 
 Schatten über den Inseln original 1952 poster on Ostfilm.de.

1952 films
East German films
1950s German-language films
German black-and-white films
Films set in Denmark
Films set in the Faroe Islands
1952 drama films
Films set in Copenhagen